The doubles competition of the 2001 Open SEAT Godó tennis tournament was held in April 2001. Nicklas Kulti and Mikael Tillström were the defending champions but did not compete that year.

Donald Johnson and Jared Palmer won in the final 7–6 (7–2), 6–4 against Tommy Robredo and Fernando Vicente.

Seeds
Champion seeds are indicated in bold text while text in italics indicates the round in which those seeds were eliminated. The top four seeded teams received byes into the second round.

Draw

Final

Top half

Bottom half

External links
 2001 Open SEAT Godó Doubles Draw

2001 Torneo Godó
Doubles